{{Infobox card game
| title = Drużbart
| image_link = File:KH from 48 German Cards.jpg
| image_caption = The Drużbart
| image_size = 130px
| alt_names =
| type = Plain-trick
| family = Karnöffel group
| players = 4
| ages =
| num_cards = 32 or 36
| deck = German pack
| play = Clockwise
| card_rank = J 8 K 9s As Js 6s (remainder are 'duds')
| origin = Poland
| related = BräusBrusBrúsBrusbart/BruusVoormsi
| playing_time =
| random_chance =
| skills =
| footnotes =
}}
Drużbart or Druzbart is an extinct Polish card game of the Bruus family. The game is descended from the oldest known card game in Europe, Karnöffel, a fact testified by its unusual card ranking and lack of a uniform trump suit.

Drużbart is designed for four players and is played with 36 cards of a German pack, each of the four suits comprising the cards 7–10, Unter, Ober, King, and Ace.

 Background 
Drużbart is one of a family of games descended from Karnöffel, the oldest European card game with a continuous tradition of play to the present day. These games are characterised by "the wildly disturbed ranking order in the chosen suit and particularly by the special role of the chosen Seven." It is one of the Brusbart family of games whose progenitor was the German game of Brusbart. Other members of the family include Russian Bruzbart or Dulya, Livonian Brusbart, Swedish Bräus, Danish and Estonian Brus, and Greenlandic Voormsi. More distant cousins include Faroese Stýrivolt and Schleswig Knüffeln.

The game was widespread in Poland during the 18th century, one account describing how ladies in an upper-class house played it as an after-dinner game along with Zwicken. In the 19th century it is recorded as being played "by the lower classes or children" and in 1840 as being "in vogue among the common people." However, there are only two imperfect descriptions of its mode of play, dating to 1831 and 1888.Stary Gracz (1888), pp. 31-33.

Druzbart was the favourite game of Count Henryk Rzewuski, the Polish journalist, novelist, and poet who was a past master of the Polish gawęda, a form of discursive fiction in which the narrator recounts incidents in a highly stylized personal language.Heraty (1981), p. 501. Adam Mickiewicz, the Polish poet and scholar, was also a player and enjoyed Drużbart during his stay in St. Petersburg in 1828.

Druzbart appears to be extinct, although it was included in a 2012 reprint of the 1930 card game compendium by Gracz.Wytrawny Gracz (2012), pp. 31-33.

 Cards 
A German-suited, Polish-pattern pack of 36 cards was used. In the 1831 account the beaters rank as follows, from highest to lowest (D = Deuce, O = Ober, U = Unter):
 8 – Dola K – Drużbart 9 – Starka 9  9  9
 D  D  D  D
 O  O  O  O
 U  U  U  U
 6  6  6 6

Cards of the same value (e.g. the four Obers) ranked among one another in the suit order shown above: Acorns, Leaves, Hearts, Bells. The three highest cards are called matadors (matedorami), and their names appear to derive from the German words Toller ("the mad one"), Brusbart ("bushy beard"), and Starker ("the strong one"). Sevens were unbeatable when led, and the remaining cards—the Eights, Kings, and Tens—were 'duds', only fit for discarding.

 Rules 
The following outline of the rules is based on Gołębiowski (1831) and Stary Gracz (1888). The 1930 rules by Wytrawny Gracz are largely a reprint of the 1888 rules.

A 32- or 36-card German-suited, Polish pattern pack was used.

The aim is to win the most tricks and achieve certain feats. Four players form two teams of two with partners sitting opposite one another and sharing a common trick pile. There are no trumps and, at each card rank (excepting matadors and duds), suits have the following order of precedence: Acorns, Leaves, Hearts, and Bells. The dealer deals 9 cards to each player, presumably clockwise and in packets of three, but the sources are silent on the exact procedure.

Forehand leads with any card. Players need not follow suit, but must head the trick to win it. Sevens are unbeatable when led, but otherwise worthless and cannot beat any other card. Eights, Tens, and Kings are of no value, with the exception of those that are matadors.

The player who has played the highest card wins the trick and leads to the next. If four duds are played, the player who led the first dud wins the trick and leads to the next. Nine tricks are played and there are penalties for losing four tricks in a row, losing the first five tricks or losing all nine.

 Scoring 
Two different scoring systems are described, neither of which is totally clear. 

 Gołębiowski (1831) 

Gołębiowski says that players draw a diagram in the form of a noughts and crosses layout. The team scoring the most tricks erases a line or, if they take the first four, two lines. It is not clear whether the 'lines' are drawn apart from the noughts and crosses diagram or within it. The team that erases their lines first, records "as many sticks" for their opponents as they have left. If the Druzbart is captured by the Dola, the capturing team awards 'spectacles' (okulary) to the side that lost the Druzbart; if the Druzbart is lost to one's partner, 'scissors' (nożyczki) are awarded. These may be, in effect, the 'noughts' and 'crosses' in the diagram. Various penalty symbols are awarded for other feats. A team losings all its tricks receives a "whip" (biczyk); a team losing the first five tricks receives a "cat" (kota) and a team losing having taken only one trick chalks up a "dagger" (rożen).

 Gracz (1888) 
According to Stary Gracz, players chalk a number of lines on a slate, known as clubs (palek), sticks (kijów), canes (rózg), broomsticks (ożogów), etc. A line is erased for each deal won and an extra line for taking four tricks in succession. Losing a matador, now including the Starka, results in 'spectacles' being awarded; losing one to a partner results in 'scissors' being chalked up for that side. A 'dagger' is drawn for the side that fails to erase more than one line during the game. A team winning all nine tricks chalks a 'cat' for their opponents. A team with a run of cards e.g. 6-7-8-9, chalk up a 'gypsy' (cygana) for their opponents and if a team has the Dola and Starka, their opponents receive a 'Jew' (żyda). If the sequence includes the Druzbart, a 'goat' (kozę) is drawn. "The variety and originality of these drawings depend on the players' sense of humour and imagination" and result in "endless laughter and mirth".

 Clock Druzbart 
Gołębiowski describes a three-hand game known as Clock Druzbart (Zégarek drużbart). Here, players play for themselves and lines are chalked up in the form of a tripod with one line erased for each trick taken. Otherwise the rules are the same as in the four-player game.

 Footnotes 

 References 

 Literature 
 Doroszewski, Witold, ed. (1960), Slownik języka polskiego, p. 396.
 Dummett, Michael (1978). Reviews of "Der Nidwaldener Kaiserjass Und Seine Geschichte" and "Der Kaiserjass, Wie Er Heute in Nidwalden Gespielt Wird" in The Playing Card, Vol. 9, No. 4, May 1981.
 Forster, Charles (1840). Pologne. Paris: Didot Frères.
 Giżycki Jerzy and Baruch Harold Wood (1972). History of Chess. Abbey Library.
 Gołębiowski, Łukasz (1831). Gry i zabawy różnych stanów w kraju całym, lub niektórych tylko prowincyach. Warsaw. pp. 45/46.
 Gracz, Stary [Stanislaw Kozietulski writing under the pseudonym of “Old Player”] (1888). Gry w karty dawniejsze i nowe. Warsaw: S. Olgebranda Synów. pp. 31–33.
 Gracz, Wytrawny ["Consummate Player"] (1930, reprinted 2012). Gry w karty polskie i obce. Warsaw: Wydawnictwo Xeein.
 Heraty, J. (1981). New Catholic Encyclopedia, Volumes 1-19.
 McLeod, John (1996). "Styrivolt, Vorms and Cicera" in The Playing Card, Volume 25, No. 2.
 Miłosz, Czesław (1983). The History of Polish Literature, 2nd edn. Berkeley/LA/London: UCP.
 Parlett, David (2008). The Penguin Book of Card Games, Penguin, London. 
 Smith, Anthony (1997). "Voormsi: A Greenlandic Descendant of Karnöffel" in The Playing-Card with which is incorporated Playing-Card World; Journal of the International Playing-Card Society, Vol. 26, by Beal, ed. George, July/August 1997 - May/June 1998. Published by The International Playing-Card Society, ISSN 0305-2133.
 Ward, Sir Adolphus William, George Walter Prothero, and Stanley Leathes (1909). The Cambridge Modern History, Volume 11. Catholic University of America: University Press.

 External links 
 Gloger, Zygmunt (1901). "Drużbart" in Encyklopedja starapolska ilustrowana'', Volume 2, Laskauer. Largely a copy of Gołębiowski's text.

Polish card games
German deck card games
Four-player card games
Karnöffel group
18th-century card games